Mycock is a surname. Notable people with the surname include:

 David Mycock (1921–1990), English footballer
 David Mycock (born 1969), English footballer
 Joe Mycock (1916–2004), English rugby union player
 Tommy Mycock (1923–1988), English footballer